Rhodri Talfan Davies (born 9 February 1971) is a Welsh television executive. He is Director of Nations at the BBC and is the director of BBC Cymru Wales. He is a former journalist and communications executive.

Personal life and education
Davies was born in Cardiff in 1971 to Elizabeth Siân Vaughan Yorath and Geraint Talfan Davies, the chairman of Welsh National Opera and a former controller of BBC Cymru Wales. His grandfather Aneirin Talfan Davies (1909–1980) was a poet, broadcaster and literary critic.

Educated at Ysgol Gyfun Gymraeg Glantaf, Cardiff, and Royal Grammar School, Newcastle upon Tyne, Davies went on to study as an undergraduate at Jesus College, Oxford (BA Hons), and received a postgraduate diploma in journalism from Cardiff University.

Career
Davies's career began with a short tenure as a sub-editor at the Western Mail in 1993. In the same year he joined the BBC as a news trainee, where he remained as a news reporter and producer until 1999.

Davies was head of regional programmes at BBC West in Bristol from 1999-2001, taking charge of BBC television, online and local radio services across the region. He left the BBC in 2001 to become director of TV at the newly launched Homechoice (now TalkTalk TV). In 2005 he was appointed head of TV marketing at the cable operator ntl.

In 2006 Davies returned to the BBC as head of strategy and communications. He was appointed director of BBC Cymru Wales in September 2011.

In December 2020 Davies was appointed as BBC Director of Nations, with responsibility for nations and local audiences in Scotland, England and Northern Ireland. He retained his role as director of BBC Cymru Wales alongside the new role.

References

1971 births
Living people
Mass media people from Cardiff
People educated at Ysgol Gyfun Gymraeg Glantaf
People educated at the Royal Grammar School, Newcastle upon Tyne
Alumni of Jesus College, Oxford
Alumni of Cardiff University
BBC executives
British television executives
Journalists from Cardiff